Alexander Antropov (born August 16, 1990) is a Russian former professional ice hockey player.

He played 12 games in the Kontinental Hockey League (KHL) with Avtomobilist Yekaterinburg during the 2011–12 KHL season.

References

External links

1990 births
Living people
Avtomobilist Yekaterinburg players
Russian ice hockey forwards